Auriglobus silus is a species of pufferfish in the family Tetraodontidae. It is a tropical freshwater fish known only from Indonesia that reaches 8.2 cm (3.2 inches) SL. Like the other four members of Auriglobus, it was previously classified as a species of Chonerhinos.

References 

Tetraodontidae
Fish described in 1982